Helen May Leach  (née Keedwell; born 3 July 1945) is a New Zealand academic specialising in food anthropology. She is currently a professor emerita at the University of Otago.

Early life and family
Born Helen May Keedwell in Wellington on 3 July 1945, Leach is the daughter of Peggy and Harvey Keedwell. Her older sister, Nancy Tichborne, was a watercolour artist.

After moving with her family to Dunedin in the early 1950s, Leach was educated at Otago Girls' High School. She went on to study at the University of Otago, from where she graduated Master of Arts.

Career
Leach was appointed to the staff of the University of Otago in 1972, and was appointed to a chair in anthropology in 2002. Originally trained in archaeology, she completed a PhD in 1976 at Otago, with a thesis titled Horticulture in prehistoric New Zealand: an investigation of the function of the stone walls of Palliser Bay.

Leach has studied food, eating, cooking, associated equipment and paraphernalia in New Zealand. Her interests range from prehistoric horticulture and the evolution of human diet to the history of cooking, the origins of recipes as well as the development of kitchens and batteries de cuisine in the twentieth century. Her extensive collection of cookery books, especially community cookbooks, has provided a significant resource for colleagues' investigations  that compensated for the incompleteness of that of the National Library of New Zealand.  Reviewing Leach's most recent book Kitchens, Barbara Santich observed that "New Zealanders are indeed fortunate to have Helen Leach as guide, guardian and safe-keeper of their gastronomic past", noting too that the work was illustrated with images of artefacts from Leach's own personal collection.

When Leach retired from the University of Otago in 2008, she was granted the title of emeritus professor.

Honours
Leach was elected a Fellow of the Royal Society of New Zealand in 2004. In the 2018 Queen's Birthday Honours, she was appointed an Officer of the New Zealand Order of Merit, for services to culinary anthropology.

Bibliography 
 Kitchens: The New Zealand Kitchen in the 20th Century (2014)
 From Kai to Kiwi Kitchen (2011)
 The Pavlova Story: A Slice of New Zealand's Culinary History, Photographs Mary Browne, Otago University Press, 2008, 
 The Pavlova (2009)
 Cultivating Myths (2000)
 1000 Years of Gardening in New Zealand (1984)
 Prehistoric Men in Palliser Bay (1979)
 Subsistence Patterns in Prehistoric New Zealand (1969)

References

1945 births
Living people
People from Wellington City
People educated at Otago Girls' High School
University of Otago alumni
New Zealand anthropologists
Academic staff of the University of Otago
Fellows of the Royal Society of New Zealand
Officers of the New Zealand Order of Merit